Aleksandr Surenovich Dronov (born 6 October 1946) is a Russian International Correspondence Chess Grandmaster. He is most famous for being the 22nd, 27th, and 29th World Correspondence Chess Champion. He is the only person to win the World Correspondence Chess Championship three times.

References

External links
 

1946 births
Living people
World Correspondence Chess Champions
Russian chess players
Soviet chess players
Sportspeople from Moscow